FC Lokomotiv Nizhny Novgorod was a Russian football club based in Nizhny Novgorod. They spent eight seasons in the Russian Premier League.

History

Early years
The team of the railway workers was founded in Nizhny Novgorod in 1916. Later it was known as Chervonka (1918-1922), Spartak (1923-1930), Tyaga (1931), Zheleznodorozhniki (1932-1935). In 1936 the team was renamed Lokomotiv and retained this name until 2002, when it was renamed Lokomotiv-NN. During the existence of the USSR the club was a part of the Lokomotiv Voluntary Sports Society.

Modern Lokomotiv
Lokomotiv was mostly known for its football school and did not play in the Soviet league until 1987. In 1989, Lokomotiv won promotion to the First League and spent two years there.

In 1992, after the dissolution of USSR, Lokovotiv was entitled enter the Russian Premier League, and reached the best result in club's history, a 6th position. Lokomotiv finished 8th in 1994 and 1996 before being relegated after the 1997 season, during which it reached the semifinal of the Intertoto Cup. However, the club won promotion back immediately and spent another two seasons in the Premier League (1999 and 2000). After finishing last in the 2001 First Division, the club was relegated. Before starting in the Second League it folded.

Lokomotiv-GZhD
In 2002, a new club Lokomotiv-GZhD was created by the Gorkiy Railways and sponsored by the Nizhniy Novgorod Oblast Administration entering the Amateur Football League. In 2002, Lokomotiv won promotion to the Second Division and played there until 2005. In 2006, the club was disbanded.

Lokomotiv-NN
On December 26, 2018, the Ministry of Justice of the Nizhny Novgorod Region registered the legal entity “Nizhny Novgorod City Public Organization Football Club Lokomotiv-NN”. For the season of 2019, the Lokomotiv-NN club announced at the Championship of Russia among exercise therapy (III division, Privolzhie zone), and in the 2019 championship of the region a second team remained to play, receiving a Balakhna registration. At the end of the first round in the MFS "Privolzhye" championship, the team withdrew from the competition.

Reserve squad 
Lokomotiv's reserve squad played professionally as FC Lokomotiv-d Nizhny Novgorod in the Russian Third League in 1996-1997.

Notable past players 
Had international caps for their respective countries. Players whose name is listed in bold represented their countries while playing for Lokomotiv.

    Dmitri Kuznetsov
   Sergei Gorlukovich
   Vladimir Tatarchuk
   Ivan Hetsko
   Dmitri Cheryshev
  Andrei Afanasyev
  Pyotr Bystrov
  Lyubomir Kantonistov
  Yuri Matveyev
  Gennadiy Nizhegorodov
  Andrei Novosadov
  Andrey Movsisyan
  Arthur Petrosyan
  Alyaksandr Oreshnikow
  Mikalay Ryndzyuk
  Andrei Satsunkevich
  Vladimir Sheleg
  Valer Shantalosau
  Kakhaber Gogichaishvili
  Gocha Gogrichiani
  Zurab Ionanidze
  Zurab Popkhadze
  Igor Avdeev
  Aleksandr Familtsev
  Ruslan Gumar
  Sergey Timofeev
  Arsen Tlekhugov
  Viktor Zubarev
  Zakir Jalilov
  Nazim Adzhiyev
  Aleksandrs Isakovs
  Virginijus Baltušnikas
  Vidas Dančenka
  Darius Gvildys
  Vadimas Petrenko
  Nerijus Vasiliauskas
  Marek Hollý
  Arsen Avakov
   Mukhsin Mukhamadiev
  Rustam Khaidaraliyev
  Yuri Kalitvintsev
  Yuri Moroz
  Vladyslav Prudius
  Aleksandr Sayun
  Mihai Drăguş

References

External links
Official Website 

 
Association football clubs established in 1916
Association football clubs disestablished in 2019
Defunct football clubs in Russia
Nizhny Novgorod
Sport in Nizhny Novgorod
1916 establishments in the Russian Empire
2019 disestablishments in Russia